Sydney Anicetus Charles (17 April 1926 – 4 September 2018) was a Trinidadian Roman Catholic bishop. Charles was born in Trinidad and Tobago and was ordained to the priesthood in 1954. He served as bishop of the Roman Catholic Diocese of Saint George's in Grenada from 1975 to 2002.

Early life
	
Charles was born on 17 April 1926 in Saint Joseph, Trinidad and Tobago. He was the 11th of 12 children.

Career
 
In 1954, Charles was ordained as a priest for the Roman Catholic Archdiocese of Port of Spain. In 1975, Charles was consecrated as the third Bishop of the Roman Catholic Diocese of Saint George's in Grenada. In 2014, Charles celebrated 60 years of priesthood.

Death
 	
Charles died on 4 September 2018 at the General Hospital in St. George's, Grenada.

References

1926 births
2018 deaths
Grenadian Roman Catholic bishops
Trinidad and Tobago emigrants to Grenada
People from Tunapuna–Piarco
Roman Catholic bishops of Saint George's in Grenada